Geranium subcaulescens (grey cranesbill) is a species of flowering plant in the geranium family Geraniaceae, that is native to Italy, Turkey and the Balkans.

It requires sharp drainage, so is suitable for cultivation in a rock garden, or as an under-planting groundcover with larger plants such as roses.  Numerous cultivars have been selected. The species G. subcaulescens, and the cultivars 'Giuseppii'  and 'Splendens' have gained the Royal Horticultural Society's Award of Garden Merit. 

The Latin specific epithet subcaulescens means "with a small stem".

Synonyms
 Geranium cinereum var. rupestris
 Geranium cinereum var. subcaulescens
 Geranium cinereum forma genuinum
 Geranium cinereum subsp. subcaulescens
 Geranium cinereum var. macedonicum
 Geranium humbertii

References

subcaulescens